Eagle Snacks is a brand name for snack food originally introduced by the Anheuser-Busch company in 1979. Eagle Snacks is not to be confused with Eagle Brand, a trademark used by Borden to market its sweetened condensed milk and dessert lines, now owned by The J.M. Smucker Co.

History
Anheuser-Busch marketed various snack foods, which typically were bite-size pretzels, potato chips, cheese snacks, and others that were distributed to bars and airlines. The snacks were in various shapes, sometimes depicting an eagle, hence the name "Eagle Snacks". An eagle is featured prominently in the Anheuser-Busch logo.

The Eagle Snack mix featured eagle-shaped pretzels and bacon-cheddar crackers, reproducing Anheuser-Busch's interlocking "A" and eagle logo, as well as the company's famed honey-roasted peanuts.

Jack Klugman and Tony Randall of The Odd Couple television show starred in a number of television commercials and print ads for Eagle Snacks during the 1980s and 1990s.

The brand was determined to be unprofitable for Anheuser-Busch and it sold the brand to Procter & Gamble in 1996. P&G got rights to the products and brand, but not the Anheuser-Busch logo originally used to market the brand. P&G licensed the brand to Chicago-based Reserve Brands Inc. in 2007.

Current status
As of August 30 2021, the Eagle Snacks brand is now owned and operated by Eagle Snacks Inc. (owned by The Raimondi Family ) and located in Farmingdale, New York.

References

Anheuser-Busch
Brand name snack foods
Former Procter & Gamble brands